Harold Vaughan James (31 January 1868 – 19 October 1948) was a British archer.  He competed at the 1908 Summer Olympics in London.  James entered the men's double York round event in 1908, taking 6th place with 652 points.

References

External links
 
 
 Harold James' profile at Sports Reference.com

1868 births
1948 deaths
Archers at the 1908 Summer Olympics
Olympic archers of Great Britain
British male archers